Elizabeth Bruenig ( Stoker; born December 6, 1990) is an American journalist working as an opinion writer for The Atlantic. She previously worked as an opinion writer for The New York Times, and as an opinion writer and editor for The Washington Post, where she wrote about ethics, politics, theology, and economics, and where she was a finalist for the Pulitzer Prize for Feature Writing in 2019.

Early life and education 
Bruenig was born in Arlington, Texas. She attended Martin High School. She graduated from Brandeis University in 2013 with a Bachelor of Arts degree with a double major in English and sociology and a minor in Near Eastern and Judaic studies. As a recipient of the Marshall Scholarship, she studied at Jesus College at the University of Cambridge, where she earned a Master of Philosophy degree in Christian theology under the supervision of John Hughes. She was named a 2014–2015 Presidential Fellow at Brown University, where she was a doctoral student in religious studies, but left Brown without a degree in 2015.

Career 
Bruenig was an opinion writer and editor for The Washington Post, The New York Times, and now writes for The Atlantic. She writes about ethics, politics, theology, and economics. Previously, she was a staff writer for The New Republic. With her husband Matt, Bruenig co-hosts a podcast The Bruenigs. In the past, they have written together for The Atlantic. She has also been a contributor to the Left, Right, & Center radio show. On May 12, 2021, it was announced that she would depart The New York Times for The Atlantic at the end of the month.

Bruenig has been described as being on "the Catholic Left" by Rod Dreher in The American Conservative. In a profile published by Washington Monthly, she is described as "the most prominently placed of a small but increasingly visible group of young writers unabashedly advocating for democratic socialism." In an article in Deseret News, Lois Collins described Bruenig as "just left of Bernie Sanders on economics, openly religious and quietly anti-abortion."

In September 2018, Bruenig described a 2006 sexual assault on a woman by the name of Amber Wyatt at Martin High School in Arlington, Bruenig's own alma mater, in a story for the Post, describing the assault's repercussions. She started tracking the details of Wyatt's story in 2015. In 2019, Bruenig was named a Pulitzer Prize finalist in Feature Writing, for one of her pieces covering Wyatt's sexual assault, "What Do We Owe Her Now?" The citation read: "For eloquent reflections on the exile of a teen sexual assault victim in the author's Texas hometown, delving with moral authority into why the crime remained unpunished."

Bruenig was named in the 2019 edition of Forbes magazine's 30 Under 30 list.

Personal life 
Bruenig was raised Methodist, but converted to Catholicism after studying Christian theology and the work of St. Augustine of Hippo in university, becoming confirmed into the Catholic church in 2014. Bruenig married Matt Bruenig, whom she met in their high school debate team in Arlington, in 2014. They have two daughters together.

Published works 
 "Taking Augustine as Guide". In Schwindt, Daniel (ed.). Radically Catholic in the Age of Francis: An Anthology of Visions for the Future. Valparaiso, Indiana: Solidarity Hall Press. 2015. .
 "Church". In McElwee, Joshua J.; Wooden, Cindy (eds.). A Pope Francis Lexicon. Collegeville, Minnesota: Liturgical Press. 2018. pp. 15–17. .

References 

1990 births
Living people
21st-century American newspaper editors
21st-century American non-fiction writers
21st-century American women writers
21st-century Roman Catholics
Alumni of Jesus College, Cambridge
American Christian socialists
American democratic socialists
American podcasters
American political commentators
American political writers
American social commentators
American women columnists
American women podcasters
The Atlantic (magazine) people
Brandeis University alumni
Catholic socialists
Catholics from Texas
Converts to Roman Catholicism from Methodism
Editors of Washington, D.C., newspapers
Journalists from Texas
Marshall Scholars
Martin High School (Arlington, Texas) alumni
The New Republic people
The New York Times columnists
People from Arlington, Texas
Religion journalists
Roman Catholic writers
The Washington Post people
Women newspaper editors
Writers from Texas
Texas socialists